Ray Stafford (born April 18, 1947) is an American former sports shooter. He competed in the trap event at the 1968 Summer Olympics.

References

1947 births
Living people
American male sport shooters
Olympic shooters of the United States
Shooters at the 1968 Summer Olympics
People from St. Francis, Kansas
Sportspeople from Kansas